Joseph Fry Jr. (August 4, 1781 – August 15, 1860) was an American politician who served as a Jacksonian member of the U.S. House of Representatives for Pennsylvania's 7th congressional district from 1827 to 1831.

Biography
Joseph Fry Jr. was born in Upper Saucon Township, Pennsylvania. He participated in mercantile pursuits in Fryburg (later Coopersburg, Pennsylvania).  He was a member of the Pennsylvania House of Representatives in 1816 and 1817, and served in the Pennsylvania State Senate for the 8th district from 1817 to 1821.  He served in the State militia and attained the rank of colonel.

Fry was elected to the Twentieth Congress and reelected as a Jacksonian to the Twenty-first Congress.  He was not a candidate for renomination in 1830.  He resumed business activities, and was a member of the State constitutional convention in 1837 and 1838.  He died in Allentown, Pennsylvania and is interred at the Union-West End Cemetery in Allentown.

References

External links

The Political Graveyard

|-

|-

Members of the Pennsylvania House of Representatives
Pennsylvania state senators
People from Lehigh County, Pennsylvania
1781 births
1860 deaths
Jacksonian members of the United States House of Representatives from Pennsylvania
19th-century American politicians